The  is a national expressway in Hokkaido, Japan. It is owned and operated by East Nippon Expressway Company.

Naming
The road is named the Dō-Ō Expressway ( "Central Hokkaidō Expressway") in Japanese; however, it's also known as the Hokkaido Expressway.

Route description

The expressway connects the north of Hokkaido with the south via the city of Sapporo. Extension of the expressway in the north towards the city of Wakkanai and in the south towards the city of Hakodate is underway; although the Hokkaido Expressway itself is not planned to extend as far as these two cities, various expressway-standard roads (bypasses of National Route 40 to the north and National Route 5 to the south) will cover the remaining distances.

Some unfinished sections of the expressway (Shibetsu-Kenbuchi Interchange to Nayoro Interchange in the north and Ōnuma Interchange to Nanae Interchange in the south) will be constructed according to the New Direct Control System. These sections are expected to operate toll-free upon completion.

The section from Sapporo-minami Interchange through Sapporo Junction to Sapporo-nishi Interchange on the Sasson Expressway is built to an urban expressway standard and the tolls are charged at a flat rate. As of March 2008 the toll on this section is 400 yen for regular passenger cars. Tolls on all other sections of the expressway are assessed according to distance travelled in the same manner as most other national expressways.

History
4 December 1971 - Kitahiroshima Interchange - Chitose Interchange section opened.
19 September 1972 - Kitahiroshima Interchange - Chitose Interchange section expanded to 4 lanes.
24 October 1978 - Chitose Interchange - Tomakomai-higashi Interchange section opened.
29 October 1979 - Sapporo-minami Interchange - Kitahiroshima Interchange section opened.
29 October 1980 - Tomakomai-higashi Interchange - Tomakomai-nishi Interchange section opened.
9 November 1983 - Sapporo Interchange - Iwamizawa Interchange section opened.
30 November 1983 - Tomakomai-nishi Interchange - Shiraoi Interchange section opened.
18 October 1985 - Shiraoi Interchange - Noboribetsu-higashi Interchange section opened.
25 October 1985 - Sapporo Interchange - Sapporo-minami Interchange section opened.
9 October 1986 - Noboribetsu-higashi Interchange - Noboribetsu Muroran Interchange section opened.
18 September 1987 - Iwamizawa Interchange - Bibai Interchange section opened. Mikasa and Bibai Interchanges become the first in Japan to implement automated ticket dispensers at toll gates.
8 October 1988 - Bibai Interchange - Takikawa Interchange section opened.
12 September 1989 - Takikawa Interchange - Fukagawa Interchange section opened.
30 October 1990 - Fukagawa Interchange - Asahikawa Takasu Interchange section opened (originally 2 lanes, expansion to 4 lanes completed in 2004).
26 April 1991 - Highway Oasis opened at Sunagawa Service Area (at that time the second in Japan in first in Hokkaido).
25 October 1991 - Noboribetsu Muroran Interchange - Muroran Interchange section opened.
30 September 1992 - Sapporo Junction is opened, connecting with the Sasson Expressway.
27 October 1992 - Muroran Interchange - Date Interchange section opened.
30 March 1994 - Date Interchange - Abuta Tōyako Interchange section opened.
22 October 1997 - Abuta Tōyako Interchange - Oshamanbe Interchange section opened.
23 March 1998 - Connection with the Hidaka Expressway is completed at Tomakomai-higashi Interchange.
11 April 1998 - Fukagawa Junction is opened, connecting with the Fukagawa-Rumoi Expressway.
7 October 1999 - Chitose-Eniwa Junction is opened, connecting with the Dōtō Expressway.
November 1999 - Chitose-bound exit opened at Sapporo-minami Interchange.
29 March 29, 2000 - Date Interchange - Toyoura Interchange section closed due to risk of eruption from nearby Mount Usu.
13 July 2000 - Temporary Abuta Tōyako Interchange opened, allowing access to Toyoura Interchange.
4 October 2000 - Asahikawa Takasu Interchange - Wassamu Interchange section opened.
9 February 2001 - Date Interchange - Toyoura Interchange section reopened.
30 June 2001 - Temporary Abuta Tōyako Interchange closed due to full reopening of expressway.
10 September 2001 - Asahikawa-bound entrance opened at Sapporo-minami Interchange.
17 October 2001 - Fukagawa Interchange - Otoe Parking Area section expanded to 4 lanes.
19 November 2001 - Oshamanbe Interchange - Kunnui Interchange section opened.
30 September 2003 - Otoe Parking Area - Asahikawa Takasu Interchange section expanded to 4 lanes.
4 October 2003 - Wassamu Interchange - Shibetsu-Kenbuchi Interchange section opened.
27 March 2004 - Pippu Junction is opened, connecting with the Asahikawa-Monbetsu Expressway.
18 November 2006 - Kunnui Interchange - Yakumo Interchange section opened.
21 December 2007 - Abuta Tōyako Interchange is moved to a new location to meet the rebuilt National Route 230.
10 October 2009 - Yakumo Interchange - Otoshibe Interchange section opened.
26 November 2011 - Otoshibe Interchange - Mori Interchange section opened.
10 November 2012 - Mori Interchange - Ōnuma Kōen Interchange section opened.
3 August 2013 - New Chitose Airport Interchange opened.
13 December 2020 - Tomakomai-chūō Interchange opened.

List of interchanges and features

 IC - interchange, JCT - junction, SA - service area, PA - parking area, BS - bus stop, SIC - smart interchange, TB - toll gate

Southern route (Sapporo JCT - Nanae IC)

Northern route (Sapporo JCT - Nayoro IC)

References

External links 
 East Nippon Expressway Company 

Expressways in Japan
Proposed roads in Japan
Roads in Hokkaido
Yakumo, Hokkaido